Eleodes granosa is a species of desert stink beetle in the family Tenebrionidae.

References

Further reading

External links

 

Tenebrionidae
Beetles described in 1866